Pathan Kot a town near Bhawana City, which is a tehsil of Chiniot a city in Punjab, Pakistan. It is located on the Jhang - Chiniot road, 16 km from Bhawana City towards Chiniot.

References 

Chiniot District
Populated places in Chiniot District